Moses David Vali (or Valle) was an Italian Jewish rabbi and doctor; born at Padua; died there 1777.

Biography
He was a kabbalistic scholar of repute, and lectured before the Paduan association known as "Mevakshei Adonai," in company with the two noted scholars Israel Hezekiah Treves and Jacob Ḥazaḳ. These lectures were attended by Ramchal, who, becoming deeply interested in kabbalah, began to study it under Vali both with the association and in his own home, Ramchal's acute intellect exceeding that of his confrères.

At the age of twenty-five Vali wrote a polemical work in Italian against Christianity, divided into seven parts, and entitled "I Sette Giorni della Verità." Between 1721 and 1767 he wrote eight large volumes in Hebrew, the greater part of them consisting of a commentary upon the entire Bible. They are still unpublished. Ephraim Luzzatto wrote a sonnet entitled "Eleh Bene ha-Ne'urim," praising the lectures of Vali and Treves.

References

 Its bibliography:
 Kerem Ḥemed, iii. 119, 130, 131;
 Steinschneider, Hebr. Bibl. vi. 49–50.

18th-century Italian rabbis
Rabbis from Padua
18th-century Italian physicians
18th-century Jewish physicians